The Pentax K-50 is a 16.3-megapixel mid-level Pentax digital single-lens reflex camera, announced on 12 June 2013. It is the direct successor to the Pentax K-30 model, both of which are weather-sealed.

The main differences over the Pentax K-30 include a more traditional body design, 120 available body color combinations, higher max ISO range (up to 51 200), compatibility with Eye-Fi cards and an improved kit lens (Pentax K-30 included the DA L 18-55mm lens, while Pentax K-50 bundles a water-resistant version, the DA L 18-55mm WR, both with plastic mounts).

Among APS-C mid-range DSLRs
Among competing APS-C mid-range DSLRs, the Pentax K-50 has the smallest body, although it is 4 mm wider than its nearest rival, the Nikon D5300. The body is made from stainless steel and polycarbonate resin, as is the Canon EOS 700D. The Pentax K-50 has an onboard microphone but lacks the audio-in port of most comparable cameras, limiting its usefulness to videographers. Pentax is the only company to include a weather-resistant kit lens, Pentax K-50 with DA L 18-55mm f3.5-5.6 WR, while the higher-model Pentax K-3 offers the 18-135mm F3.5-5.6 WR in one of its kits. The Pentax K-50 is available for around $300 (body only) and less than $400 with kit lens, as of the end of July 2015, which puts it at a very low price point compared to its competition (Canon EOS 70D, Canon EOS 700D, Nikon D5300, Nikon D7100 and Pentax K-3).

Pentax K-500 
The Pentax K-500 is an entry-level sibling of the Pentax K-50, sharing almost all of its features. The main differences between the two cameras are the K-500's lack of colored body options (only black), electronic level, weather sealing, and focus point visualisation through the optical viewfinder. As a consequence of the lack of weather sealing, this camera is bundled with the non-weather-sealed DA L 18-55mm kit lens, and most variants of the camera come with an AA battery holder included as opposed to the D-Li109 rechargeable Li-ion battery included with the K-50. However, the camera is still compatible with the aforementioned Li-ion battery.

References

External links

Pentax K-50 - Pentax US
Specifications - RICOH IMAGING COMPANY, LTD. 

K-50
Live-preview digital cameras
Cameras introduced in 2013
Pentax K-mount cameras